Tolna may refer to:

 Tolna, Hungary, a town in Hungary (population 12,184)
 Tolna (county), a county in Hungary (population 238,400)
 Tolna (moth), a genus of moths in the family Erebidae
 The former Yiddish name of Talne, a town in Ukraine (population 16,388)
 Tolna, North Dakota, a village in the United States (population 202)

Hungarian words and phrases